Swithin Winston Fernando was an Anglican Bishop of Colombo in Sri Lanka.

An alumnus of Prince of Wales' College, Moratuwa he was the Archdeacon of Colombo in 1971 and consecrated Bishop of Colombo in January 1978. A incumbent of All Saints' Church, Galle and St. Luke's Church Borella, he died on 5 December 2009 and a memorial service to honour his life of service to the Anglican Communion was held the following year in February.

See also
Church of Ceylon
Anglican Bishop of Colombo
Anglican Diocese of Colombo

References

External links
 Church of Ceylon - Anglican Communion website
 Church of Ceylon news
Appreciation of Fernando's life

2009 deaths
20th-century Anglican bishops in Asia
Sinhalese priests
Sri Lankan Anglican bishops
Archdeacons of Colombo
Anglican bishops of Colombo
Year of birth missing
Alumni of Prince of Wales' College, Moratuwa